The Middle East Research and Information Project (MERIP) is a non-profit independent research group established in 1971, that has released reports and position papers on various Middle East conflicts. Its most prominent publication is Middle East Report, which is published both online and as a print magazine.

History

Originally started by a group of anti-Vietnam war activists, MERIP began in 1971 by releasing an irregularly scheduled six-page newsletter called the MERIP Reports.  In 1973, the group began releasing the Reports on a scheduled basis.  Joe Stork was the long-time editor of the Middle East Report.

MERIP is partners with the independent publishing house Pluto Press. In a press release, Pluto described their shared interests: "the mission of both organizations is to empower and educate people with alternative viewpoints on such a contested and important area of the world."

References

External links

Foreign policy and strategy think tanks in the United States
Middle Eastern studies in the United States
News agencies based in the United States
United States–Middle Eastern relations
Organizations established in 1971
Non-profit organizations based in the United States
1971 establishments in the United States